The 1878 Middlesbrough by-election was a parliamentary by-election held on 5 July 1878 to elect a new Member of Parliament (MP) for the British House of Commons constituency of Middlesbrough in the North Riding of Yorkshire.

Vacancy 
The vacancy was caused by the death on 18 June 1878 of the town's Liberal MP, Henry Bolckow.

The town of Middlesbrough had been enfranchised by the Representation of the People Act 1867, and at the United Kingdom general election the industrialist Henry Bolckow had been elected unopposed as its first Member of Parliament (MP). In 1853, he had become the town's first mayor.

Candidates 
Two candidates were nominated.

The Conservative Party candidate was Samuel Sadler, the owner of a major chemicals business in the town, and Mayor of Middlesbrough in 1877.  The Liberal Party selected Isaac Wilson, whose railway locomotive business had been merged in 1865 to Hopkins, Gilkes & Co. Wilson had been Mayor in 1854.

Results 
The result was a victory was for Wilson, who held the seat for the Liberal with a comfortable majority of 37.6% of the votes.

Aftermath 
Wilson held the seat until he stood down at the 1892 general election.

Sadler did not stand again until the 1895 general election, when he was also unsuccessful. But he finally won the seat at the 1900 general election, 22 years after the by-election.  He was defeated at the 1906 general election.

References 

1878 elections in the United Kingdom
1878 in England
19th century in Yorkshire
By-elections to the Parliament of the United Kingdom in Middlesbrough constituencies